The Xiaomi Mi Band 3 is a wearable activity tracker produced by Xiaomi Inc. It was released on 31 May 2018. It has a capacitive OLED display. The tracker features heart rate monitoring, although it does not offer continuous heart rate display.

Specifications 
 Display: 0.78 inch OLED, single point touch screen;
 Resolution: 128 × 80 pixels;
 Button: capacitive;
 Connectivity: Bluetooth version 4.2 BLE; NFC on some models;
 Size: 46.9 × 17.9 × 12 mm;
 Weight: 20 g;
 Casing: plastic + alloy;
 Battery capacity: 110 mAh for 20 days of battery life;
 Sensors: accelerometer, optical heart rate monitor;
 Waterproof: up to 50 metres, 5 atmospheres

References

External links
 Mi Band 3 – Official website in Chinese

Wearable computers
Activity trackers
Xiaomi
Products introduced in 2018
Smart bands